Tylototriton shanorum is a newt endemic to Shan State, Myanmar, where it was recorded in Taunggyi.

References

 Nishikawa, Matsui, & Rao, 2014 : A new species of Tylototriton (Amphibia: Urodela: Salamandridae) from central Myanmar. Natural History Bulletin of the Siam Society, no. 1, .

External links

shanorum
Amphibians of Myanmar